Paul Connor may refer to:
 Paul Connor (Coronation Street), fictional character on a soap opera
 Paul Connor Jr., fictional character on British soap opera Coronation Street, nephew of the above
 Paul Connor (footballer) (born 1979), English professional footballer

See also
 Paul O'Connor (disambiguation)